El Diablo is a name shared by several fictional characters published by DC Comics: Lazarus Lane, Rafael Sandoval, Chato Santana. The Chato Santana version of El Diablo appeared in the 2016 Suicide Squad film set in the DC Extended Universe.

Publication history
The original version (Lazarus Lane) debuted in All-Star Western #2 (October 1970), and was created by Robert Kanigher and Gray Morrow. The character starred in a four-issue miniseries published by DC Comics through their Vertigo imprint as a mature readers title; El Diablo #1 (March 2001) was written by Brian Azzarello and drawn by Danijel Zezelj.

The second version (Rafael Sandoval) first appeared in El Diablo #1 (August 1989), and was created by Gerard Jones and Mike Parobeck.

The third version (Chato Santana) first appeared in El Diablo #1 (September 2008) and was created by Jai Nitz, Phil Hester and Ande Parks.

Fictional character biography

Lazarus Lane
Lazarus Lane is the original iteration of El Diablo, operating in the later half of the 19th century in the American Old West. Lane was originally a bank teller who is nearly killed by a gang of thieves and put in a coma after being struck by lightning. After being revived by Native American shaman "Wise Owl", Lane becomes the vigilante El Diablo. The name "El Diablo" means "the devil" in Spanish.

According to Jonah Hex vol. 2 #11 (November 2006) and #24 (December 2007), Lazarus Lane is cursed to be the host of a minor demon which acts as a Spirit of Vengeance. Lane's body slumbers in a coma while "El Diablo" roams the Earth. His fate is similar to that of the current Crimson Avenger. In Swamp Thing vol. 2 #85 (April 1989), Wise Owl is shown in a more villainous light, with Lane/El Diablo his unwilling servant. In that story, set in 1872, a number of DC's western heroes (including the aforementioned Hex, Bat Lash, Johnny Thunder (John Tane), and Madame .44) were employed by Otto Von Hammer and Jason Blood to defeat Wise Owl and recover from him an object of great power, which turned out to be a crystal containing the spirit of Swamp Thing, who had become lost in time. When the group killed Wise Owl, Lane's comatose body woke up, and El Diablo apparently vanished forever.

In The New 52 (a 2011 reboot of the DC Comics universe), Lazarus Lane appeared in a backup feature in All-Star Western. In this iteration, he was once again cursed by Wise Owl to become the host of a demon. Rather than being in a coma, Lazarus remains awake. However, El Diablo arises from his body whenever he is unconscious.

Rafael Sandoval
Rafael Sandoval was the second iteration created in 1989 by writer Gerard Jones and artist Mike Parobeck as a title set in the modern DC Universe. This title lasted 16 months. As created by Jones and Parobeck, Sandoval is a rookie member of the city council of Dos Rios, Texas, who creates his version of El Diablo (from a festival costume and an old boxing persona and local legends surrounding the Devil) after being stymied by officials while trying to pursue the case of a serial arsonist. Subsequent efforts involved battles with illicit drug smugglers using maquiladora covers for their activities, a hunt for a serial killer, conflicts with human-smuggling operations, and with Sandoval's own conscience over how best to serve the people of Dos Rios.

Rafael Sandoval's character has subsequently made guest appearances in one of the Justice League titles, in which he is possessed by the spirit of an Aztec god-emperor and takes on an appearance reminiscent of the Lazarus Lane Diablo. He also appears in the Villains United Special when he is pulled out of retirement by Oracle to serve in her de facto Justice League, whereupon he is attacked by a member of the Royal Flush Gang during a battle at the Enclave M prison in the Sonora Valley, Mexico. He is wounded in the battle, but saved from death by the warden of the facility.

Chato Santana
The current iteration of El Diablo is Chato Santana, an ex-criminal who after being hospitalized, meets a still living comatose Lazarus Lane. It is written by Jai Nitz, pencilled by Phil Hester, with inks by Ande Parks.

In The New 52 reboot of DC's continuity, Santana's El Diablo is a member of the Suicide Squad. He is later recruited into Checkmate under the leadership of Uncle Sam, until he realizes that he is being lied to and abandons them in search of the truth.

In other media

Television
 The Lazarus Lane incarnation of El Diablo appears in the Justice League Unlimited episode "The Once and Future Thing Part One: Weird Western Tales", voiced by Nestor Carbonell.
 The Chato Santana incarnation of El Diablo appears in the Teen Titans Go! episode "TV Knight 2". This version's design is based on the DCEU incarnation (see below).

Film

The Chato Santana incarnation of El Diablo appears in the DC Extended Universe (DCEU) film Suicide Squad, portrayed by Jay Hernandez. This version previously used his powers to establish himself as a gang leader before accidentally destroying his family home in a moment of anger, killing his wife and two children in the process. Guilt-ridden, he was incarcerated in Belle Reve Penitentiary and vowed never to use his powers again. Despite being forced into Amanda Waller's Task Force X program, he maintains his vow until he is goaded by Deadshot into using his powers to defend the squad from the Enchantress' forces. El Diablo later helps his squad-mates resist the Enchantress' illusions before sacrificing himself to kill her brother Incubus.

Video games
 The Chato Santana incarnation of El Diablo appears in Lego Batman 3: Beyond Gotham via "The Squad" DLC.
 The Chato Santana incarnation of El Diablo appears as a playable character in Suicide Squad: Special Ops.

Miscellaneous
The Chato Santana incarnation of El Diablo makes background appearances in DC Super Hero Girls as a student of Super Hero High.

References

External links
 Newsarama: El Diablo Returns at DC in 2008 – Interview with Jai Nitz (November 17, 2007)
 DCU Guide: El Diablo 1
 DCU Guide: El Diablo 2
 EL Diablo #1 & #2: Review of the Vertigo mini-series

Articles about multiple fictional characters
1989 comics debuts
Characters created by Phil Hester
Characters created by Robert Kanigher
Comics characters introduced in 1970
Comics characters introduced in 1989
Comics characters introduced in 2008
DC Comics male superheroes
DC Comics martial artists
DC Comics superheroes
DC Comics titles
Fictional characters with fire or heat abilities
Fictional Hispanic and Latino American people
Fictional boxers
Fictional characters from Texas
Fictional filicides
Fictional gangsters
Fictional murderers
Mexican superheroes
Suicide Squad members
Western (genre) comics
Vigilante characters in comics
Fictional people from the 19th-century